Selce is a village north of Pivka in the Inner Carniola region of Slovenia.

Geography

Selce is a clustered village in the Pivka Basin along the main road and rail line from Prestranek to Pivka. Most of the houses stand on a low, level area, and some are on the slope of Hrib Hill. There are cultivated fields to the west, below Matonk Hill and Podvršek Hill. There are springs in the flysch rock below Matonk Hill; these have been developed as a source of water. During strong rains, Replje Spring below Osojnica Hill flows into a creek that becomes a tributary of the Pivka River. The Avsec Quarry lies on the west slope of Osojnica Hill southwest of Selce.

Church
The local church in the settlement is dedicated to the Holy Cross and belongs to the Parish of Slavina. It dates from the 17th century and was remodeled in the 18th century.

Notable people
Notable people that were born or lived in Selce include:
Matej Milharčič (1812–1853), a priest, missionary to Africa, and temperance campaigner

References

External links

Selce on Geopedia

Populated places in the Municipality of Pivka